Jonathan Hunt may refer to:
 Jonathan Hunt (New Zealand politician) (born 1938), politician from New Zealand
 Jonathan Hunt (Vermont congressman) (1787–1832), U.S. Representative from Vermont
 Jonathan Hunt (Vermont lieutenant governor) (1738–1823), Vermont Lieutenant Governor
 Jonathan Hunt (footballer) (born 1971), English footballer
 Jonathan Hunt, vocalist of Dead To Fall
 Jonathan Hunt, vocalist of Planetshakers
 Jonathon Hunt (born 1981), American figure skater
 Jon Hunt (born 1953), founder of the Foxtons estate agency

See also 
 John Hunt (disambiguation)